MALAT1-associated small cytoplasmic RNA, also known as mascRNA, is a non-coding RNA found in the cytosol. This is a small RNA, roughly 53–61 nucleotides in length, that is processed from a much longer ncRNA called MALAT1 by an enzyme called RNase P. This RNA is expressed in many different human tissues, is highly conserved by evolution and shares a remarkable similarity to tRNA which is also produced by RNase P, yet this RNA is not aminoacylated in HeLa cells. The primary transcript, MALAT1 (metastasis associated lung adenocarcinoma transcript 1), appears to be upregulated in several malignant cancers.
Another small RNA that is homologous to mascRNA, called menRNA, is processed from another long ncRNA called MEN beta.

MALAT1 appears to be involved in the regulation of alternative splicing. MALAT1 interacts with SR proteins, influencing the distribution of these in nuclear speckle domains.

See also
 Long noncoding RNA
 MALAT1
 NEAT1

References

Further reading

External links
 OMIM page for MALAT1
 HGNC page for MALAT1
 
 Entrez Gene: MALAT1-associated small cytoplasmic RNA

Non-coding RNA